Children of the Sun may refer to:

Albums and songs
 Children of the Sun (The Sallyangie album), 1969
 Children of the Sun (Billy Thorpe album), 1979
 "Children of the Sun" (Feeder song), from the album Generation Freakshow, 2012
 "Children of the Sun" (Tinie Tempah song), from the album Demonstration, 2013
 "Children of the Sun", a song by Dead Can Dance from the album Anastasis, 2012
 "Children of the Sun", a song by Flowing Tears from the album Serpentine, 2002
 "Children of the Sun", a song by Hawkwind from the album In Search of Space, 1971
 "Children of the Sun", a song by Judas Priest from the album Firepower, 2018
 "Children of the Sun", a song by Klaxons from their untitled album, 2014
 "Children of the Sun", a song by Lindemann from the album Skills in Pills, 2015
 "Children of the Sun", a song by Mandrill from the album Mandrill Is, 1970
 "Children of the Sun", a song by The Misunderstood, 1969
 "Children of the Sun", a song by Nightstalker from the album Dead Rock Commandos, 2012
 "Children of the Sun", a song by Poets of the Fall from the album Clearview, 2016
 "Children of the Sun", a song by Billy Thorpe, 1979
 "Children of the Sun", a song by Two Steps from Hell, 2015

Film
 Children of the Sun (1962 film), directed by Jacques Séverac
 Children of the Sun (2007 film), a 2007 Israeli documentary

Other
 Children of the Sun (book), by Morris West
 Children of the Sun (play), by Maxim Gorky
 Children of the Sun (role-playing game)
 Children of the Sun (tribe), another name for the Spokane tribe of Washington
 Children of the Sun, a book by Kenjiro Haitani

See also
 Child of the Sun (disambiguation)